Alunite is a ghost town located some  south of Marysvale, near the mouth of Cottonwood Canyon in Piute County, Utah, United States. A small but important mining town during World War I, Alunite was inhabited from approximately 1915–1930.

History
In 1912 a prospector named Thomas Gillan discovered a wide vein of spar in Cottonwood Canyon. The sample he sent for analysis was identified as alunite, an ore rich in both aluminum and potash. Gillan made a deal with the Mineral Products Corporation to develop the deposit, mine the alunite, and extract potash for fertilizer. By 1915 the company had constructed a reduction plant in the mouth of the canyon to produce potash from the ore. The small company town that grew up around the plant was named Alunite. Because the town was so close to Marysvale, it never had its own church or business district, but it did have a school, company store, and post office.

When the United States entered World War I, the Alunite mines gained strategic importance as the only domestic source of potash, needed for manufacturing explosives, that was already under development. The government also saw potential in alunite's aluminum content, and installed a 24-hour work force experimenting with processes to extract alumina from alunite. This increase in employees raised the town's population over 100. The war also brought rumors of foreign spies and saboteurs. Suspicious fires were blamed on enemy agents, and there were reports of people caught trying to bomb the potash plants or gather sensitive information.

Most of the alunite mining activity ended after the war. The alumina extraction experiments had been successful, but the processes developed were prohibitively expensive. Demand for potash continued to drop, until by 1930 it was also too costly to produce. The mines closed, the mill was torn down, and Alunite became a ghost town. A second small attempt was made to extract aluminum during World War II, but none of the town was ever rebuilt. Alunite lies in ruins today; numerous foundations and walls are still visible.

See also

 List of ghost towns in Utah

References

External links
 Alunite at GhostTowns.com

Ghost towns in Utah
Mining communities in Utah
Populated places established in 1915
Company towns in Utah
Ghost towns in Piute County, Utah